Old Babylonian may refer to:
the period of the First Babylonian dynasty (20th to 16th centuries BC)
the historical stage of the Akkadian language of that time

See also
Old Assyrian (disambiguation)